Mohammad Imran bin Samso (born 19 May 1998) is a Malaysian professional footballer who plays for Malaysia Premier League side Kelantan United as a midfielder.

Career statistics

Club

References

External links
 

Living people
1998 births
People from Kelantan
Malaysian people of Malay descent
Malaysian footballers
Kelantan FA players
Association football midfielders
Association football forwards
Malaysia Super League players
Kelantan United F.C. players